Lamellitrochus inceratus is a species of sea snail, a marine gastropod mollusk in the family Solariellidae.

Distribution
This species occurs in the Caribbean Sea, the Gulf of Mexico and the Lesser Antilles.

Description 
The maximum recorded shell length is 8.2 mm.

Habitat 
Minimum recorded depth is 86 m. Maximum recorded depth is 1472 m.

References

 Quinn, J. F., Jr. 1991. Lamellitrochus, a new genus of Solariellinae (Gastropoda: Trochidae), with descriptions of six new species from the Western Atlantic Ocean. Nautilus 105: 81–91
 Rosenberg, G., F. Moretzsohn, and E. F. García. 2009. Gastropoda (Mollusca) of the Gulf of Mexico, Pp. 579–699 in Felder, D.L. and D.K. Camp (eds.), Gulf of Mexico–Origins, Waters, and Biota. Biodiversity. Texas A&M Press, College Station, Texas
 Turgeon, D.D., et al. 1998. Common and scientific names of aquatic invertebrates of the United States and Canada. American Fisheries Society Special Publication 26 page(s): 60

External links

inceratus
Gastropods described in 1991